Mangalam Nerunnu is a 1984 Indian Malayalam-language film,  directed by Mohan. The film stars Nedumudi Venu, Madhavi, Shanthikrishna and Sreenath. The film has musical score and songs composed by Ilaiyaraaja.

Cast

Nedumudi Venu as Menon
P. K. Abraham 
Premji
Sreenath as Madhu 
Madhavi as Rajini
Shanthikrishna as Usha
Mammootty as Babu
Philomina as Meenakshiyamma
K. P. A. C. Sunny
Prathapachandran
Shalini Kumar as Younger Usha (Cameo)
 P. K. Abraham
Thilakan as Kurup
Meenakumari
Jose Prakash

Soundtrack
The music was composed by Ilaiyaraaja and the lyrics were written by M. D. Rajendran.

References

External links

view film
 mangalam nerunnu

1984 films
1980s Malayalam-language films
Films directed by Mohan
Films scored by Ilaiyaraaja